Peralena Iranama is a 1949 Sri Lankan Sinhala language film which was directed by Jyotish Sinha and written by B. A. W. Jayamanne. This film is considered one of the finest Sri Lankan films in the 1940s and this was the last Sinhala film to have released in the 1940s. The film was released on the 20th of October, 1949 through the Ceylon Theatre circuits.

Cast 
 Rukmani Devi as Sunetha 
 Aruna Shanthi as Upali 
 Eddie Jayamanne as Paucha 
 Gemini Kantha as Pabi Nona
 Mark Samaranayake as Dushta Samiye

Songs 
The film consists of 3 songs.
 Hada Aadara Preme
 Olu Malehi Sudo
 Paapey Mey Jeevithe

See also 
 List of Sri Lankan films of the 1940s

References

External links 
 Sinhala Movie Database
 IMDb
1949 films
Sinhala-language films
Sri Lankan black-and-white films